Bevar Sea (pronounced as Bevarsi, a Kannada and Telugu term for "Bastard") originally called Dirt Bucket is a stoner/doom metal band based in Bangalore, India. Originally it was a bedroom project of Srikanth Panaman and Kaustubh Thirumalai, and band members Sriranjan, JP, Nikhil and Indy. However, the band formed into a quintet in late 2010 and currently consists of Avinash Ramchander, Michael Talreja, Ganesh Krishnaswamy, and Srikanth Panaman. Their self-titled debut album was mixed by Billy Anderson and released on October 16, 2012. It received critical acclaim and was included in Ninehertz's best albums of 2012. Bevar Sea was named the "Best Emerging Act" at the Rolling Stone Metal Awards India 2013.

The band names their main influences to be bands like Black Sabbath, Deep Purple, Cathedral and Orange Goblin, among others.

Biography
The Bangalore-based stoner/doom/metal quintet Bevar Sea was formed in 2008 but began performing as a quintet in late 2010. Influenced by heavy blues-rock of the 1960s and 1970s, the band is focused on presenting classic heavy metal exactly the way their experiences have led them to believe it should be, which is by employing an organic and honest approach to song writing and live musicianship.

The band draws inspiration from various and highly influential bands, including: Black Sabbath, Deep Purple, Thin Lizzy, UFO, Rainbow, Saint Vitus and Sleep, along with some other less well-known names such as Cathedral, Orange Goblin, Grand Magus, Trouble, Pentagram, Electric Wizard, High On Fire and Kyuss.

Debut album
Bevar Sea released their eponymous debut studio album on October 16, 2012 through Iron Fist Records. The album served to play a key role in pioneering the stoner rock/doom metal genre within India. This album was recorded by Srikanth & Chacko at The Doom Cave in early 2012. Drums were recorded live by Basement Tapes Studios in late 2011.

The first track of the album, "The Smiler" was a live performance with inspirations and tributes to Black Sabbath and Dio.

The second track on the album is - "Abhistu" (Sanskrit word meaning desired). The song is about a serial killer and his ride that goes around tormenting hipsters and is always on the run from the cops.

Another song of note, "Universal Sleeper", has become their set opener of late with its twin guitars, the 1970s style hooks, and the classic bluesy doom grooves. Set in limbo, a drug fiend spawns a generation of workers, a populace - bent on mind domination. The second part, the song titled “Sleeping Pool”, is when it all goes bad, and musically it creates a bleak atmosphere.

The last track of the album, is a 14 minute song called Mono Gnome. The song's story is about a short-statured man and his love for a witch. Their commune results in a fire, because of a curse that the witch carries which sets the world on fire.

Track listing

Live shows
Throughout their live performances, Bevar Sea has paid tribute to many bands with their own renditions of some classic tunes as well as deep cuts. They have done full sets of just Black Sabbath and early Pink Floyd songs, and have also done an exclusive show as a tribute to their other influences.

The band mixes up their setlists, with the goal of keeping their shows interesting to their fans. In conjunction to this, the implementation of unique artwork, employing a DIY attitude towards organising shows, self-releasing their album, and taking on promotional roles by themselves are all within the pursuit of the group's mission of becoming an integral part of the contemporary Indian underground music scene.

Milestones

February 2011: Debut gig opening for Israel’s Orphaned Land
September 2011: Special Black Sabbath tribute show
Nov 2011: One of the headliners at NLS’ Strawberry Fields
June 2012: One of the opening acts for Kreator
August 2012: Special Pink Floyd tribute show
October–November 2012: Debut album release, followed by a tour of 7-10 cities.
January 2013: Opened for the English doom band Anathema
July 2013: Awarded Best Emerging Act by Rolling Stone India

Band members
 Ganesh Krishnaswamy (vocals)
 Avinash Ramchander (bass guitar)
 Michael Talreja (lead guitar)
 Srikanth Panaman (lead guitar and songwriting)

Supporting members
Billy Anderson - audio engineer

Discography

Studio albums
Bevar Sea (2012)
Invoke the Bizarre (2015)
The Timeless Zone (2022)

References

External links
 

Indian stoner rock musical groups
Musical groups established in 2010
2010 establishments in Karnataka